The Astronauts Are Sleeping is a double album (actually released in two separate volumes) by Her Space Holiday released in 1999. It was re-released in 2002 as The Astronauts Are Sleeping 2.0.

Volume 1
This volume was released by Skylab Operations.
 "Promised a Flight"
 "Slide Guitars and Moving Cars"
 "Our Favorite Day"
 "Sweet Baby Jesus"
 "Explosion Existence"
 "The Astronauts Are Sleeping (Exit)"
 "The Fourth of July"

Volume 2
This volume was released by No Karma.
 "These Days"
 "Crazy"
 "Sunday Drivers"
 "Slide Guitars and Moving Cars (Reprise)"
 "Count on the Days"
 "Audio Phase"
 "1939"
 "You Know Why I Lie"
 "Homecoming"
 "Ceilingstars"

The Astronauts Are Sleeping 2.0
This version was released in Japan in 2002 by Neoplex Records. The tracks are taken from both albums and placed in a different order.
 The Astronauts Are Sleeping (Enter)
 Promised a Flight
 Our Favorite Day
 Sweet Baby Jesus
 Explosion Existence 
 Slide Guitars and Moving Cars
 These Days
 Sunday Drivers
 Crazy
 Count on the Days
 1939
 Ceiling Stars
 The Astronauts Are Sleeping (Exit)

References 

1999 albums
Her Space Holiday albums